Gonzalo Aja Barquín (Matienzo, Cantabria, 13 June 1946) was a Spanish professional road bicycle racer. In the 1974 Tour de France, Aja was the first cyclist on the Col du Tourmalet and the Mont Ventoux, and finished on the 5th place of the general classification.

Palmarès 

1971
Vuelta a Cantabria
1974
Santona
Tour de France:
5th place overall classification
1976
Volta a la Comunitat Valenciana
1977
Santona

References

External links 

Official Tour de France results for Gonzalo Aja

1946 births
Living people
People from Asón-Agüera
Cyclists from Cantabria
Spanish male cyclists
Tour de Suisse stage winners